Anthony Leban, is an Australian professional footballer who recently plays as a midfielder for Melbourne Victory. He made his professional debut in a FFA Cup playoff match against Perth Glory on 24 November 2021. Leban scored a penalty in the 96th minute to give Melbourne Victory a 1–0 victory over Adelaide City in the 2021 FFA Cup round of 32.

Leban is of Croatian descent. His father, Stan, is a football coach and former player.

References

External links

Living people
Australian soccer players
Association football midfielders
Melbourne Victory FC players
National Premier Leagues players
Year of birth missing (living people)
Australian people of Croatian descent